Ascochalara is a genus of fungi within the Chaetosphaeriaceae family. This is a monotypic genus, containing the single species Ascochalara gabretae.

References

External links
Ascochalara at Index Fungorum

Chaetosphaeriales
Monotypic Sordariomycetes genera